The Qatar women's national cricket team represents the country of Qatar in international women's cricket. The team is organised by the Qatar Cricket Association, which has been a member of the International Cricket Council (ICC) since 1999.

Qatar made its international debut at the 2009 ACC Women's Twenty20 Championship in Malaysia. The team won only a single match in the group stage, against Iran, and were eventually ranked eleventh after defeating Kuwait in the eleventh-place play-off. Qatar did not participate in the tournament's 2011 edition, despite it being hosted by nearby Kuwait, but returned for the 2013 tournament in Thailand. The team again only won a single group-stage match, against Kuwait, but this was enough to place them fourth in their group (out of six teams). Qatar were easily beaten in the seventh-place play-off, however, losing to Malaysia by 36 runs. In December 2014, Qatar competed in the inaugural edition of the Gulf Cricket Council (GCC) Women's Twenty20 Championship, which was also contested by Kuwait, Oman, and the United Arab Emirates. The team placed last, but at the following year's tournament, which Qatar hosted, lost to the UAE in the final.

In April 2018, the ICC granted full Women's Twenty20 International (WT20I) status to all its members. Therefore, all Twenty20 matches played between Qatar women and another international side after 1 July 2018 will be a full WT20I. Qatar played their first matches with WT20I status in January 2020 during a triangular series against Oman and Kuwait, which was held in Doha.

Records and Statistics 

International Match Summary — Qatar Women
 
Last updated 21 December 2022

Twenty20 International 

T20I record versus other nations

Records complete to WT20I #1334. Last updated 21 December 2022.

See also
 List of Qatar women Twenty20 International cricketers

References

Cricket in Qatar
Cricket
Women's national cricket teams
Women